Allium spurium is an East Asian species of wild onion native to Russia (Amur Oblast, Buryatiya, Yakutia, Zabaykalsky Krai), Mongolia and China (Hebei, Heilongjiang, Jilin, Liaoning, Inner Mongolia).

Allium spurium  produces 1 or 2 bulbs, each up to 15 mm in diameter. Plant spreads by means of underground rhizomes. Leaves are flat, narrowly linear, about 3 mm wide. Scapes are up to 40 cm tall. Umbel is hemispheric, with many pink or lilac flowers.

References

spurium
Onions
Flora of the Russian Far East
Flora of China
Flora of Eastern Asia
Plants described in 1827